Medicine Creek is a stream in Thurston County in the U.S. state of Washington. It is a tributary to McAllister Creek.

Medicine Creek received its name from Native Americans of the area, who believed its waters held medicinal qualities.

References

Rivers of Thurston County, Washington
Rivers of Washington (state)